The Victoria Government Gazette is the government gazette of Victoria. It provides official notification of decisions or actions taken by, or information from, the Governor of Victoria, Victoria State Government authorities, government departments, local councils, companies, and individuals.

The Victoria Government Gazette is published by IVE Group Limited, under authority of the Victorian Government Printer.

History 
Following the establishment of the first permanent settlement in what is now Victoria in 1834, the Port Phillip District was established as an administrative division of the Colony of New South Wales. As such, the government business relating to the district were published in the New South Wales Government Gazette. This continued until 1851 with the passage of the Australian Colonies Government Act (1850), which formally separated the Port Phillip District from New South Wales to form the Colony of Victoria on the 2nd of July 1851. From 1851 onwards, government business was, and continues to be, published in the Victorian Government Gazette. Gazettes from this period until 1997 can be accessed through the Victorian State Library. Those published after 1997 can be accessed on the Government Gazette website.

Sections 
In general, notices published in the Victoria Government Gazette fall into one of the following categories:

Private Notices

 Dissolution of partnerships
 Creditors notices
 Sales by the Sheriff

Proclamations by the Governor

 Acts of Parliament
 Commencement of Acts

Government & Outer Budget Sector Agencies Section

 Council Notices, road discontinuances and local laws
 Council Planning Scheme Amendments
 State Trustees
 Exemptions (by VCAT)
 Sales of Crown Land
 Acts & notices required under particular Acts
 Infrastructure (Departmental notices of Planning Scheme Amendments)

Orders in Council

 Orders signed by the Governor in Council

References

External links 

 Gazettes published between 1836 and 1997 can be accessed through the Victorian State Library
 Gazettes published after 1997 can be accessed on the Government website

Government gazettes of Australia
Victoria State Government